The University of North Carolina at Pembroke (UNCP or UNC Pembroke) is a public university in Pembroke, North Carolina. UNC Pembroke is a master's level degree-granting university and part of the University of North Carolina system. Its history is intertwined with that of the Lumbee nation.

History
The educational institution that developed into UNC Pembroke has its origins in the circumstances of the post-Civil War South. This school was a part of the effort of the Lumbee Nation in North Carolina to preserve their unique identity. Access and authority over their own educational system were understood to be of key importance to retaining Lumbee culture, instilling a sense of pride, and improving the group's economic and social conditions.

Croatan Normal School was created by the General Assembly on March 7, 1887, in response to a local petition, sponsored by North Carolina Representative Hamilton McMillian of Robeson County. This event occurred in the context of competition for support between the Democratic and Republican parties in North Carolina. Hamilton MacMillian's support for the school was connected to his personal interest and research on Native American history and culture. The school's initial name, Croatan Normal School, was selected in accordance with the debatable view that this tribe included descendants of the Outer Banks Lost Colony of Sir Walter Raleigh.

The normal school opened in the spring of 1888 with one teacher and 15 students with the goal of training American Indian public school teachers. Initially, enrollment was limited to the American Indians of Robeson County. In this period school enrollment was often quite limited among the general population. Funding by the state was patchy at best and there was a high level of illiteracy. The creation of a centralized training school for teachers was thought to be the best method of addressing this problem in the given circumstances.

In 1909, the school moved to its present location, about a mile east of the original site. The name was changed in 1911 to the Indian Normal School of Robeson County, and again in 1913 to the Cherokee Indian Normal School of Robeson County, tracking the legislature's designation for the Indians of the county, who at one time claimed Cherokee descent. In 1926 the school became a two-year post-secondary normal school; until then it had provided only primary and secondary instruction.

In 1939 it became a four-year institution, and in 1941 was renamed Pembroke State College for Indians. The next year, the school began to offer bachelor's degrees in disciplines other than teaching. In 1945 the college was opened to members of all federally recognized tribes. A change of name to Pembroke State College in 1949 presaged the admission of white students, which was approved in 1953 for up to forty percent of total enrollment. The Brown v. Board of Education ruling the following year by the United States Supreme Court ended race restrictions at the college. Between 1939 and 1953, Pembroke State was the only state-supported four-year college for Indians in the United States.

In 1969 the college became Pembroke State University, a regional university that was incorporated into the University of North Carolina system in 1972. The first master's degree program was implemented in 1978. On July 1, 1996, Pembroke State University became The University of North Carolina at Pembroke.

Campus

The university's campus is situated just north of Pembroke, located directly behind N.C. Highway 711. Interstate 74 is located just minutes from campus, as is Interstate 95. The center of campus is considered to be the Chavis University Center (often referred to as the University Center, or the UC). Students can bowl, play pool and related games as well as socialize in the lounge. The dining hall and a fast-food outlet are located in the UC.

The UC lawn, an open grass area in front of the UC, is where students play amateur sports, read on benches, or use the area for free speech. The eastern side of campus includes the Livermore Library, Oxendine Science Building, Old Main, and Wellons Hall, among other buildings. The campus on the west side has the Business Administration Building, Education Center, and most of the residence hall communities such as Oak Hall, Pine Hall, North, and Belk. Lumbee Hall, the Dial Humanities building, the Sampson building, the Auxiliary building, the Jones Athletic Center, and the Givens Performing Arts Center make up most of the north end of campus.

The campus is home to Givens Performing Arts Center, a regional center for culture, arts, and entertainment. GPAC hosts numerous Broadway shows, orchestras, shows geared towards children, and also hosts the "Distinguished Speaker Series," in cooperation with the Association of Campus Entertainment, which has brought in notable people such as Cory Booker, Bill Nye, Jodi Sweetin, Patch Adams, Gabby Douglas and Hill Harper, among many others.

Organization
The title of Principal or Superintendent was used prior to 1940. After 1940, when UNC Pembroke became a collegiate-level institution, the title of President was used. Upon becoming a member institution of the University of North Carolina system, the title was changed to Chancellor.

Presidents

 Dr. O. H. Browne (1940–1942)
 Dr. Ralph D. Wellons (1942–1956)
 Dr. Walter J. Gale (1956–1962)
 Dr. English E. Jones (1962–1972)

Chancellors
 Dr. English E. Jones (1972–1979)
 Dr. Paul R. Givens (1979–1989)
 Dr. Joseph B. Oxendine (1989–1999)
 Dr. Allen C. Meadors (1999–2009)
 Dr. Charles R. Jenkins (2009–2010)
 Dr. Kyle R. Carter (2010–2015)
 Dr. Robin G. Cummings (2015–present)

Academics

UNC Pembroke currently offers hundreds of pathways to graduate and undergraduate degrees and is organized into the College of Arts and Sciences, College of Health Sciences, McKenzie-Elliott School of Nursing, Thomas School of Business, School of Education, and The Graduate School.

Departments of the College of Arts and Sciences
American Indian Studies
Art
Biology
Chemistry and Physics
English, Theatre & World Languages
Geology & Geography
History
Mass Communication
Mathematics & Computer Science
Music
Nursing
Philosophy & Religion
Political Science & Public Administration
Psychology
Sociology & Criminal Justice

Departments of the College of Health Sciences
Nursing
Social Work
Kinesiology

Departments of the Thomas School of Business

Accounting & Finance
Economics & Decision Sciences
Management, Marketing & International Business

Departments of the School of Education
Educational Leadership & Specialties
Teacher Education Program
Counseling

The Graduate School Programs
Art Education
Business Administration (accelerated online MBA available)
Clinical Mental Health Counseling
Elementary Education
English Education
English as a Second Language Licensure, Add-on
Exercise/Sports Administration concentration in Physical Education (MA)
Mathematics Education
Middle Grades Education
Nursing (MSN)
Health & Physical Education
Public Administration (MPA)
Reading Education
School Administration (MSA)
Professional School Counseling
Science Education
Social Studies Education
Social Work
Special Education
Master of Arts in Teaching (MAT)

Students and faculty
UNCP offers small class sizes; the student-to-faculty ratio is 18:1, and classes average 20 students. In addition, classes are taught exclusively by professors, instructors, or other faculty. There are no classes on campus taught by graduate assistants. The school has an enrollment of 8,319 students; of these, 6,318 students are undergraduate, and 2,001 are graduate students. The fall 2021 enrollment marks the fourth consecutive year of record enrollment growth.

Rankings

The 2002 edition of U.S. News & World Report on "America's Best Colleges", UNC Pembroke was ranked in the Regional Universities – South category 65th overall, and 30th in "Top Public Schools", 18th in the "Top Performers on Social Mobility", and tied for the most ethnically diverse campus in the South.

Sports, clubs, and traditions

Athletics

UNC Pembroke's athletic teams are known as the Braves. Due to its heritage as an institution founded by American Indians for the education of American Indians and the continued support from the Lumbee Tribe of North Carolina, the school has largely been immune to the ongoing controversies related to American Indian-themed nicknames and mascots.

The school is a member of the NCAA's Division II and competes in Conference Carolinas and the Mountain East Conference. The school fields varsity sports teams for women and men.

Greek life and student organizations
UNCP, as well as the Office of Greek Life and the Campus Engagement & Leadership office, offers a variety of extracurricular activities for students. From academic-based and service organizations to minority organizations and Greek life, UNCP offers more than 100 organizations geared toward the student's specific needs.

Fraternities
Alpha Phi Alpha
Alpha Sigma Phi
Kappa Alpha Psi
Lambda Theta Phi (Latino)
Omega Psi Phi
Phi Beta Sigma
Phi Kappa Tau
Phi Mu Alpha Sinfonia
Phi Sigma Nu (American Indian)
Theta Xi

Sororities
Alpha Kappa Alpha
Alpha Pi Omega (American Indian)
Alpha Sigma Alpha
Delta Sigma Theta
Kappa Delta
Lambda Theta Alpha (Latina)
Sigma Omicron Epsilon (American Indian)
Sigma Sigma Sigma
Zeta Phi Beta
Zeta Tau Alpha

Media 
While the Netflix show The Chair is situated in a Pembroke University, it is a fictional Ivy League University and not the University of North Carolina at Pembroke.

Notable alumni
Brad Allen, NFL official
Derek Brunson, 3-time NCAA Division II All-American wrestler at UNCP; professional MMA fighter, formerly fought in Strikeforce, now currently fighting in the UFC
Sascha Görres, German footballer who currently plays for Richmond Kickers in the USL Professional Division
Charles Graham, member of the North Carolina House of Representatives
Jerry P. Lanier, former U.S. Ambassador to Sudan and a career diplomat with the U.S. Department of State
Sally McRorie, educator, psychologist and painter
Pardon Ndhlovu, marathon runner from Zimbabwe, competed at the 2016 Summer Olympics and placed 41st in the men's marathon competition
Julian Pierce, civil rights activist
Ruth Revels, American Indian activist and educator
Kelvin Sampson, head basketball coach for the Houston Cougars, former NBA assistant coach for the Milwaukee Bucks, former Washington State, University of Oklahoma, and Indiana University head coach

References

External links

UNCP Athletics website

 
University of North Carolina at Pembroke
Educational institutions established in 1887
Universities and colleges accredited by the Southern Association of Colleges and Schools
Education in Robeson County, North Carolina
Buildings and structures in Robeson County, North Carolina
1887 establishments in North Carolina
University and college buildings on the National Register of Historic Places in North Carolina
National Register of Historic Places in Robeson County, North Carolina